John Lindsay, OAM (born 29 January 1970) is an Australian Paralympic athlete from Melbourne. He competed in the 1988 Seoul games in distances ranging from 100 m to 800 m, but did not win any medals. At the 1992 Barcelona Games, he won a gold medal in the Men's 200 m TW3 event, for which he received a Medal of the Order of Australia, a silver medal in the Men's 100 m TW3 event and a bronze medal in the Men's 400 m TW3 event. That year, he had a Victorian Institute of Sport scholarship. He was also working as a fitness instructor in 1992, held world records in the 100 m and 200 m events, and was ranked 6th in the world in the 400 m. He won a gold medal in the men's athletics 100 m T52 event at the 1996 Summer Paralympics with a time of 15.22, a silver medal in the 200 m T52 event with a time of 27.38, and a bronze medal in the 400 m T52 event with a time of 52.93. At the 2000 Sydney Games, he won a gold medal in the Men's 100 m T53 event, a silver medal as part of the Men's 4x100 m Relay T54 team, and a bronze medal in the Men's 200 m T53 event; he was also part of the Men's 4x400 m Relay T54 team, which was the only one to qualify in its heat, but it did not make it to the finals. At the 2004 Athens Games, he came seventh in the first round of the Men's 100 m T53 event and sixth in the third round of the Men's 200 m T53 event. He was an Australian Institute of Sport scholarship holder in 1995 and 2000.

In 1996, Kingston City Council created the John Lindsay Reserve in Patterson Lakes, Victoria. In 2000, he received an Australian Sports Medal.

References

External links
 John Lindsay at Australian Athletics Historical Results
 

1970 births
Living people
Paralympic gold medalists for Australia
Paralympic silver medalists for Australia
Paralympic bronze medalists for Australia
Athletes (track and field) at the 1988 Summer Paralympics
Athletes (track and field) at the 1992 Summer Paralympics
Athletes (track and field) at the 1996 Summer Paralympics
Athletes (track and field) at the 2000 Summer Paralympics
Athletes (track and field) at the 2004 Summer Paralympics
Medalists at the 1992 Summer Paralympics
Medalists at the 1996 Summer Paralympics
Medalists at the 2000 Summer Paralympics
Athletes from Melbourne
Recipients of the Medal of the Order of Australia
Recipients of the Australian Sports Medal
Australian Institute of Sport Paralympic track and field athletes
Victorian Institute of Sport alumni
Australian male wheelchair racers
Paralympic medalists in athletics (track and field)
Paralympic athletes of Australia
Sportsmen from Victoria (Australia)